The necklace problem is a problem in recreational mathematics concerning the reconstruction of necklaces (cyclic arrangements of binary values) from partial information.

Formulation 
The necklace problem involves the reconstruction of a necklace of  beads, each of which is either black or white, from partial information. The information specifies how many copies the necklace contains of each possible arrangement of  black beads.
This can be made formal by defining a -configuration to be a necklace of  black beads and  white beads, and counting the number of ways of rotating a -configuration so that each of its black beads coincides with one of the black beads of the given necklace.

The necklace problem asks: if  is given, and the numbers of copies of each -configuration are known up to some threshold , how large does the threshold  need to be before this information completely determines the necklace that it describes? Equivalently, if the information about -configurations is provided in stages, where the th stage provides the numbers of copies of each -configuration, how many stages are needed (in the worst case) in order to reconstruct the precise pattern of black and white beads in the original necklace?

Upper bounds 
Alon, Caro, Krasikov and Roditty showed that 1 + log2(n) is sufficient, using a cleverly enhanced inclusion–exclusion principle.

Radcliffe and Scott showed that if n is prime, 3 is sufficient, and for any n, 9 times the number of prime factors of n is sufficient.

Pebody showed that for any n, 6 is sufficient and, in a followup paper, that for odd n, 4 is sufficient. He conjectured that 4 is again sufficient for even n greater than 10, but this remains unproven.

See also

 Necklace (combinatorics)
 Bracelet (combinatorics)
 Moreau's necklace-counting function
 Necklace splitting problem

References 
 
 
 
 
 

Combinatorics on words
Recreational mathematics